Bravo Eugenia is a superyacht built by Oceanco in 2018. The ship's exterior was designed by Nuvolari Lenard and its interior was designed by Reymond Langton Design. The yacht has a steel hull and an aluminium superstructure.

During construction, the vessel was referred to as 'Project Bravo and was also sometimes referred to by her yard number, Y718. The yacht had its technical launch on February 14, 2017 at Zwijndrecht. It was moved to Oceanco's other shipyard at Alblasserdam in the subsequent hours for outfitting. The yacht was delivered on  December 20, 2018. Bravo Eugenia is owned by Jerry Jones who named it in honour of his wife, Gene. In 2020, Jones made his NFL draft onboard the vessel.

Specifications 

 Length Overall: 109.0 M
 Beam Overall: 16.3 M
 Classification: Lloyd's Register
 Maximum speed: 17.5 knots (32 km/h)
 Material: Steel hull & Aluminium superstructure
 Engine type: 2 X MTU 2,920HP diesel engines with heat and energy recovery system and integrated battery system.
 Naval architect: Lateral Naval Architects
 Exterior designer: Nuvolari Lenard
 Interior designer: Reymond Langton Design

Amenities:

 Two helicopter pads.
 Spa.
 Steam Room.
 Sauna.
 Gymnasium.
 Beach Club.
 Plunge Pool.

Gallery

References 

Individual yachts